The Triennial 2016 was the Triennial sanctioned by the Bureau of International Expositions (BIE) in the Italian city of Milan. Its theme was 21st century. Design after Design.

It was the first Triennial governed by the current BIE treaty. Thus picking up a tradition, by the BIE and Milan, of architecture and design expositions held since 1923 in Northern Italy after a break of twenty years.

References 

World's fairs in Milan
2016 in Italy
Tourist attractions in Milan